Wedgewood may refer to:

Locations
Wedgewood, Alberta, hamlet in Alberta, Canada
Wedgewood, Nova Scotia, a neighbourhood in Halifax, Nova Scotia, Canada
Wedgwood, Fort Worth, Texas, United States
 Wedgewood Heights, Edmonton, a neighbourhood in Edmonton, Alberta, Canada
 Wedgewood Park, St. John's, a neighbourhood in St. John's, Newfoundland and Labrador, Canada

Products
Wedgewood stove

Schools
 Wedgewood Junior School, a school in Eatonville, Toronto, Ontario, Canada

Venues
 The Wedgewood Rooms, an entertainment venue in Southsea, Hampshire, England
 Wedgewood Village Amusement Park, an amusement park in Oklahoma City, Oklahoma, United States

See also
 Wedgwood (disambiguation)